Harry Berrios (born December 2, 1971) is a former professional baseball player who is now an assistant coach for Davenport University. He usually played left field, or Designated Hitter, but in the 2006 season, Berrios played at 1st base for a few games due to the retirement of Jon Benick. He played for the Winnipeg Goldeyes from 2002 to 2006.  The team released him after a slow start to the 2006 season and he signed with their rivals the Fargo-Moorhead RedHawks. Harry had 54 home runs and 291 RBIs from 2002 to 2005 with the Goldeyes. His batting average in those 4 years with Winnipeg was .327.

High school
Harry prepped at Ottawa Hills High School in Grand Rapids, MI where he excelled in football and baseball. In the fall of 1989 he tied a Michigan state record with a 99-yard touchdown run in a game against Jenison High School. He led the Ottawa Hills High School baseball team to the Grand Rapids City League Championship in the spring of 1990.

College
Harry was drafted out of high school to play baseball but elected to attend LSU where he won 2 NCAA Championships in baseball. In 1992, he played collegiate summer baseball with the Chatham A's of the Cape Cod Baseball League and was named a league all-star. In 1993 he was named the Most Valuable Player of the SEC tournament.

Professional career
Drafted: - Selected by Texas Rangers in 16th Round (427th overall) of 1990 amateur entry draft (June-Reg)  ... Selected by Baltimore Orioles in 8th Round (231st overall) of 1993 amateur entry draft (June-Reg)  Jun 24,1993 - signed  Jul 21,1996 - Released by Orioles  Aug 5,1996 - Signed by Indians  Oct 15,1996 - Granted free agency  Feb 22,1997 - re-signed by Indians  Mar 29,1997 - Released by Indians  May 1, 1997 - Signed by independent Sioux Falls (Northern)  Jul 1,1998 - Signed by independent Thunder Bay (Northern)  May 1, 1999 - Signed by independent Schaumburg (Northern)  Aug 8,2000 - Contract purchased by Rangers from Schaumburg  Mar 18,2002 - Released by Rangers  May 1, 2002 - Signed by independent Winnipeg (Northern)

Awards

References

External links
 
 Winnipeg Goldeyes Official Website
 Redhawks Official Site

Living people
LSU Tigers baseball players
Chatham Anglers players
Baseball players from Grand Rapids, Michigan
Fargo-Moorhead RedHawks players
Winnipeg Goldeyes players
1971 births
Albany Polecats players
Bowie Baysox players
Frederick Keys players
Kinston Indians players
Sioux Falls Canaries players
Thunder Bay Whiskey Jacks players
Schaumburg Flyers players
Tulsa Drillers players
Oklahoma RedHawks players